The Hindu Group is an Indian publishing company based in Chennai. Its first publication was The Hindu, a daily newspaper that began publication in 1878.

Hindu Group Publications
The Hindu Group publishes a number of newspapers and magazines and other journals.
 The Hindu - National Daily Newspaper
 The Hindu Business Line – Business Daily
 Sportstar – Weekly Sports magazine
 Frontline – Fortnightly features magazine
 Survey of Indian Industry – An annual review on Indian Industries
 Survey of Indian Agriculture – An annual review on Indian Agriculture
 Survey of the Environment – An annual review of the Environment
 Indian Cricket – An annual record book on Cricket
 The Hindu Index – Monthly and Cumulated Annual
 Special Publications under the series The Hindu Speaks on Libraries: Information Technology, Management, Education, Religious Values, Music, ...
 From the pages of The Hindu—The Last 200 Days of Mahatma Gandhi
 The Hindu (Tamil) – Tamil language daily
 Kamadenu – Weekly Tamil Magazine
 NDTV Hindu  – Chennai based English and Tamil news channel (now stopped)
 RoofandFloor.com - a Chennai-focussed real-estate portal 
 The Hindu Images

References

External links
 Official Website

 
Newspaper companies of India
Companies based in Chennai
Mass media companies established in 1878
Indian companies established in 1878